The Greater Hamburg Act, in full the Law Regarding Greater Hamburg and Other Territorial Readjustments, was passed by the government of Nazi Germany on 26 January 1937, and mandated the exchange of territories between Hamburg and the Free State of Prussia. It became effective on 1 April 1937.

Greater Hamburg 
Hamburg lost most of its exclaves, including Geesthacht and Cuxhaven. In return, Hamburg was enlarged by including formerly Prussian towns like Altona, Wandsbek, and Harburg-Wilhelmsburg as well as a number of villages. Altona and Wandsbek had been part of the Prussian province of Schleswig-Holstein, while Harburg-Wilhelmsburg had been a part of the Prussian province of Hanover. This represented the formal merger of what had previously been referred to as the "Four-City Region".

Lübeck 
Besides the regulations for Hamburg, the law incorporated most of the Free City of Lübeck into the Prussian province of Schleswig-Holstein, though some smaller villages were included in the State of Mecklenburg. This constituted a victory for the Gauleiter (regional party leader) of Schleswig-Holstein, who had competed with the neighbouring Gauleiter of Mecklenburg for control of the city ever since 1933.

Until the Greater Hamburg Act, Lübeck had been a separate member state of the Reich. Two reasons for ending this status are cited: Adolf Hitler had a distaste for Lübeck ever since the city council forbade him to campaign there in 1932., and Lübeck formed part of the compensation given to Prussia for its losses to Hamburg (besides Lübeck, Prussia also gained Hamburg's territories of Geesthacht, which was also incorporated into the province of Schleswig-Holstein, and Ritzebüttel (including Cuxhaven), which went to the Province of Hanover).

Notes and references

Further reading 
 Dr William Boehart: "Das Groß-Hamburg-Gesetz — Ein Rückblick 70 Jahre danach". In Lichtwark-Heft Nr. 71, November 2006. Verlag HB-Werbung, Bergedorf. .

External links 

 Text of the law 
 German website on history of Lübeck

1930s in Hamburg
History of Lübeck
20th century in Schleswig-Holstein
Prussian law
20th century in Mecklenburg-Western Pomerania
1937 in law
1937 in Germany
Hamburg law